The year 2016 is the 5th year in the history of the Glory, an international kickboxing event. 2016 saw the promotion introduce its Women's Super Bantamweight division. The events were broadcasts through television agreements with ESPN and other regional channels around the world.

List of events

Glory 27: Chicago

Glory 27: Chicago was a kickboxing event held on February 26, 2016, at the Sears Centre in Hoffman Estates, Illinois, USA.

Background
This event featured world title fight for the Glory Middleweight Championship between Artem Levin and Simon Marcus as headliner. Also this event featured 4-Man Middleweight Contender Tournament to earn a title shot for the Glory Middleweight Championship.

Results

2016 Glory Middleweight Contender Tournament bracket

Glory 28: Paris

Glory 28: Paris was a kickboxing event held on March 12, 2016, at the AccorHotels Arena in Paris, France.

Background
This event featured three world title fight for the Glory Heavyweight Championship between Rico Verhoeven and Mladen Brestovac as headliner, Glory Light Heavyweight Championship between Saulo Cavalari and Artem Vakhitov, and the Glory Featherweight Championship between Serhiy Adamchuk and Mosab Amrani. Also this event featured 4-Man Lightweight Contender Tournament to earn a title shot for the Glory Lightweight Championship.

Results

2016 Glory Lightweight Contender Tournament bracket

Glory 29: Copenhagen

Glory 29: Copenhagen was a kickboxing event held on April 16, 2016, at the Forum Copenhagen in Copenhagen, Denmark.

Background
This event featured world title fight for the Glory Welterweight Championship between Nieky Holzken and Yoann Kongolo as headliner, and 4-Man Heavyweight Contender Tournament to earn a title shot for the Glory Heavyweight Championship.

Results

2016 Glory Heavyweight Contender Tournament bracket

Glory 30: Los Angeles

Glory 30: Los Angeles was a kickboxing event held on May 13, 2016, at the Citizens Business Bank Arena in Ontario, California, USA.

Background
This event featured world title fight for the Glory Middleweight Championship between Simon Marcus and Dustin Jacoby as headliner, and 4-Man Welterweight Qualification Tournament with the winner being granted entry into Welterweight Contender Tournament later this year. The event also marked the launch of Glory's first women's division with the beginning of a Grand Prix tournament to crown the promotion's first Bantamweight Championship.

Results

2016 Glory Welterweight Qualification Tournament bracket

Glory 31: Amsterdam

Glory 31: Amsterdam was a kickboxing event held on June 25, 2016, at the Amsterdam RAI in Amsterdam, Netherlands.

Background
This event was originally scheduled to feature two world title fights for the Glory Lightweight Championship between Robin van Roosmalen and Sitthichai Sitsongpeenong, and the Glory Light Heavyweight Championship between Artem Vakhitov and Mourad Bouzidi, but Vakhitov was out due to injury and Zack Mwekassa replaced him for the interim title. Also this event featured 4-Man Welterweight Contender Tournament to earn a title shot for the Glory Welterweight Championship.

Results

2016 Glory Welterweight Contender Tournament bracket

Glory 32: Virginia

Glory 32: Virginia was a kickboxing event held on July 22, 2016, at the Ted Constant Convocation Center in Norfolk, Virginia, USA.

Background
This event featured world title fights for the Glory Featherweight Championship between Serhiy Adamchuk and Gabriel Varga as headliner. Also this event featured 4-Man Light Heavyweight Contender Tournament to earn a title shot for the Glory Light Heavyweight Championship.

Results

2016 Glory Light Heavyweight Contender Tournament bracket

Glory 33: New Jersey

Glory 33: New Jersey was a kickboxing event held on September 9, 2016, at the Sun National Bank Center in Trenton, New Jersey, USA.

Background
This event featured two world title fights for the Glory Heavyweight Championship between Rico Verhoeven and Anderson Braddock, for the Glory Middleweight Championship between Simon Marcus and Jason Wilnis. Also this event featured a 4-Man Featherweight Contender Tournament.

Results

2016 Glory Featherweight Contender Tournament bracket

Glory 34: Denver

Glory 34: Denver was a kickboxing event held on October 21, 2016, at the 1stBank Center in Broomfield, Colorado, USA.

Background
This event featured world title fights for the Glory Welterweight Championship between Nieky Holzken and Murthel Groenhart & the Glory Featherweight Championship between Gabriel Varga and Robin van Roosmalen. Also this event featured 4-Man Middleweight Contender Tournament.

Results

2016 Glory Middleweight Contender Tournament bracket

Glory 35: Nice

Glory 35: Nice was a kickboxing event held on November 5, 2016, at the Palais Nikaia in Nice, France.

Background
This event featured world title fights For the Unification of the Light Heavyweight Championship between Artem Vakhitov and Zack Mwekassa as headliner. Also this event featured 4-Man Heavyweight Contender Tournament to earn a title shot for the Glory Heavyweight Championship and the last quarter-finals bout of the Women's Super Bantamweight Grand Prix.

Results

2016 Glory Heavyweight Contender Tournament bracket

Glory 36: Oberhausen

Glory 36: Oberhausen is a kickboxing event held on December 10, 2016, at the König Pilsener Arena in Oberhausen, Germany.

Background
This event featured the highly anticipated Heavyweight showdown between GLORY Heavyweight champion, Rico Verhoeven and Badr Hari, promoted as "Glory Collision".

The event also featured two world title fights the first was for the Glory Welterweight Championship between Nieky Holzken and Cédric Doumbé and the second was for the Lightweight Championship between Sitthichai Sitsongpeenong and Marat Grigorian. Also this event featured a 4-Man Lightweight Contender Tournament and the Semi-Finals/Final of the Women's Super Bantamweight.

Davit Kiria has withdrawn from the event, for unknown reasons. Dylan Salvador has replaced him against Anatoly Moiseev in GLORY 36 lightweight 'Contender' tournament.

Results

2016 Glory Lightweight Contender Tournament bracket

See also
2016 in K-1 
2016 in Kunlun Fight

References

Glory (kickboxing) events
2016 in kickboxing